The Satu Mare Swabians or Sathmar Swabians (German: Sathmarer Schwaben) are a German ethnic group in the Satu Mare region of Romania. They are one of the few Danube Swabian subgroups that are actually Swabian, and their dialect, Sathmar Swabian, is similar to the other varieties of the Swabian German dialect.

Most were originally farmers in Upper Swabia who migrated to Partium (at the time Hungary, now Romania) in the 18th century, as part of a widespread eastward movement of German workers and settlers. Their principal settlements were Satu Mare, Carei, Petrești, and Foieni and they also settled in Urziceni, Căpleni, Tiream, Beltiug, Ciumești, and Ardud.

After World War II, many evacuated, migrated, or were expelled to what became West Germany. Those who remain in Romania, along with other German-speaking groups in this country, are politically represented by the FDGR/DFDR (Democratic Forum of Germans in Romania); in Germany, the Landsmannschaft der Sathmarer Schwaben in Deutschland (Territorial Association of Sathmar Swabians in Germany) represents and assists them. Nowadays, many are more or less magyarized and have become Hungarians. The Satu Mare Swabians or Sathmar Swabians are part of the Romanian Germans.

History 

The Sathmar Swabians' ancestors stem from Upper Swabia (situated in southern Württemberg area), present-day Germany when the first waves of agricultural colonists arrived in north-western and northern Transylvania during the 18th century, during the end of the Modern Age.

Further reading 

 Povești din folclorul germanilor din România by Roland Schenn, Corint publishing house, 2014 (in Romanian)

References 

Hungarian-German people
Danube-Swabian people
History of Transylvania (1683–1848)
Maramureș
Ethnic groups in Transylvania
Ethnic German groups in Romania